Stella Doufexis (15 April 1968 – 15 December 2015) was a German mezzo-soprano in opera and concert.

She was married to the German composer and musician Christian Jost. She died of cancer at age 47.

References

External links

 
 Stella Doufexis Komische Oper Berlin 
 Stella Doufexis Gasteig 
 Stella Doufexis Operabase

1968 births
2015 deaths
Musicians from Frankfurt
German operatic mezzo-sopranos
German people of Greek descent
Berlin University of the Arts alumni
Deaths from cancer in Germany